EPON may refer to:
 Ethernet passive optical network
 United Panhellenic Organization of Youth, a Greek leftist youth organization founded during World War II
 A type of epoxy resin used in sample preparation for electron microscopes.